Thomas Gaunt House, also known as The President's Home, is a historic home located at Maryville, Nodaway County, Missouri. It was built about 1865, and is a two-story, modified "L"-plan, brick dwelling in the late Greek Revival style.  It has a shallow pitched hipped roof with a broad cornice. It features Neoclassical porches supported by grouped Tuscan order columns. It is owned by Northwest Missouri State University, and is occupied by the president of the university.

It was listed on the National Register of Historic Places in 1979.

References

Houses on the National Register of Historic Places in Missouri
Greek Revival houses in Missouri
Houses completed in 1865
Buildings and structures in Nodaway County, Missouri
National Register of Historic Places in Nodaway County, Missouri